Senator Dunne may refer to:

Joe E. Dunne (1881–1963), Oregon State Senate
John R. Dunne (born 1930), New York State Senate
Matt Dunne (born 1969), Vermont State Senate

See also
Senator Dunn (disambiguation)